Bove is a surname. Notable people with the name include:

 Carol Bove (born 1971), American artist
 Davide Bove (born 1998), Italian footballer
 Edward Bove, American surgeon
 Linda Bove (born 1945), deaf American actress
 Raphael Bove (born 1977), Italian Australian footballer

See also
 Bové, a surname (including a list of people with the name)
 Bove (disambiguation)